Cyclostrema tortuganum, common name the Tortugas cyclostreme, is a species of sea snail, a marine gastropod mollusk in the family Liotiidae.

Description
The size of the shell varies between 4 mm and 10 mm.

Distribution
This species occurs off in the Gulf of Mexico (East Florida, Cuba), the West Indies (the Dry Tortugas, Virgin Islands: St. Croix), the Caribbean Sea (Colombia, Venezuela) and the Atlantic Ocean (Bahamas, Brazil).

References

 Dall, W. H. 1927. Diagnoses of undescribed new species of mollusks in the collection of the United States National Museum. Proceedings of the United States National Museum 70 (2668): 1–11
 Rosenberg, G., F. Moretzsohn, and E. F. García. 2009. Gastropoda (Mollusca) of the Gulf of Mexico, Pp. 579–699 in Felder, D.L. and D.K. Camp (eds.), Gulf of Mexico–Origins, Waters, and Biota. Biodiversity. Texas A&M Press, College Station, Texas.

tortuganum
Gastropods described in 1927